Print Services for UNIX is the name currently given by Microsoft to its support of the Line Printer Daemon protocol (also called LPR, LPD) on Windows NT-based systems. It is installed using the Add/Remove Programs control panel applet. This component allows LPD queues to be supported using the native Windows printing system.

History
Under Windows NT 4.0 and earlier this component was listed as "Microsoft TCP/IP Printing".

See also
Microsoft Windows Services for UNIX

External links
Print from UNIX to Windows
HOW TO: Install and Configure Print Services for UNIX—Microsoft Product Knowledge Base
UNIX to Windows Printing—Commercial Software

Windows components